The Civil Defence Act 1948 was an Act of the Parliament of the United Kingdom setting out legislation for civil defence procedures in the United Kingdom. It was repealed and replaced by the Civil Contingencies Act 2004.

See also 
 Civil Defence Act (Northern Ireland) 1950

External links 
 http://www.legislation.gov.uk/ukpga/Geo6/12-13-14/5

Civil defense
Emergency laws in the United Kingdom
United Kingdom Acts of Parliament 1948